Pierre Nora (born 17 November 1931) is a French historian elected to the Académie française on 7 June 2001. He is known for his work on French identity and memory. His name is associated with the study of new history. He is the brother of the late Simon Nora, a former senior French administrative professional.

Education 
Nora is the last son of four children – the others were Simon, Jean and Jacqueline – born to Gaston Nora, a prominent Parisian urologist, and his wife, Julie Lehman. During the war, he came to know the writer Jean Prévost and Jean Beaufret, who was to become a major figure in the introduction of Heidegger's philosophy to France. In the 1950s, together with Jacques Derrida, he took hypokhâgne and khâgne at the Lycée Louis-le-Grand but, contrary to a persistent legend, he failed three times to be accepted at the École Normale Supérieure. This setback, which he shared with his school-mate Pierre Vidal-Naquet, was one which Nora came to regard as a stroke of luck, particularly in terms of the example set by another friend, Jean-François Revel, since it led him to live a far more interesting life than would otherwise have been the case, contrasting his own situation with that of Gérard Granel. Around this time, the poet René Char came to play an important role in his formation. Through him Nora met his first love, the Madagascan Marthe Cazal (1907-1983), a major model for the figure of Justine in Lawrence Durrell's The Alexandria Quartet.

Career
He was a teacher at the Lycée Lamoricière d'Oran in Algeria from 1958 until 1960. He wrote a book about his experiences, published under the title  ("The French of Algeria") (1961). In 1962, when the Évian peace treaty was signed – later confirmed by a subsequent referendum – which ended the Algerian War, a ceasefire came into effect. Nora, despite not knowing a word of Hebrew was asked to travel there and both look into the situation of Algerian Jews and secure for repatriation their archives. He met Ben Bella who, embracing him, asked Nora to sit by his side as his motorcade drove into Algiers the following day. Ben Bella was under the impression that Nora, whose account of Algeria he had read with admiration while in prison, was a member of the local Algerian Jewish community. During the same May week, he was stopped with several others by a group of insurgents and stood against a wall for execution, a fate avoided by the timely intervention of the local police.

From 1961 to 1963, he was a resident at the Fondation Dosne-Thiers. In 2014, Nora received the Dan David Prize for his contribution to "History and Memory."

Publishing 
Concurrently, Nora had pursued an important career in publishing. He joined Éditions Julliard in 1964, where he created the Archives paperback collection. In 1965 he joined Éditions Gallimard: the publishing house, which already had a good market share in literature, wanted to develop its social sciences sector. It was Pierre Nora who achieved this mission by creating two important collections, the Library of social sciences in 1966 and the Library of histories in 1970, as well as the  collection in 1967.

At Éditions Gallimard, under Nora's direction many major works of scholarship were published that became landmarks in their respective fields. Among them figure:
 In the Library of social sciences, Raymond Aron (1967), Georges Dumézil (1968–1973), Marcel Gauchet (1985), Claude Lefort (1978), Henri Mendras (1988), Michel Foucault (Les Mots et les Choses,, 1966, and L'Archéologie du savoir, 1969).
 In the Library of histories, François Furet (1978), Emmanuel Le Roy Ladurie (1975, best sale of the collection with 145 000 copies), Michel de Certeau (1975), Georges Duby (1976), Jacques Le Goff (Saint Louis, 1997), Jean-Pierre Vernant (1989), Maurice Agulhon (1988–1996), Michel Foucault (Histoire de la folie à l'âge classique, 1972, 1975, and Histoire de la sexualité, 1976–1984).
 Foreign researchers whom he introduced in France, like Ernst Kantorowicz (1959, published in 1989), Thomas Nipperdey (1983–1992, in 1992), Karl Polanyi (1944, in 1983).

This important role gave to Nora a certain power in French publishing and he was also the object of criticism. He declined to translate Eric Hobsbawm's work, The Age of Extremes (1994). Nora admired the book, admitted its high quality but after a long delay, turned it down, telling Hobsbawm that the high costs of translation would make its sale price prohibitive, and the French left itself, given the times, would be hostile. A further reason, Nora mentioned to a third party, was that the Shoah by then had moved to the centre of cultural memory and the word Auschwitz only appeared once in Hobsbawm's book. Publicly, he stated in 1997 that his rejection stemmed from the author's "attachment to the revolutionary cause". Nora explained that context of hostility towards Communism in France was not appropriate to that type of publication, that all the editors, "like it or not, had an obligation to take account of the intellectual and ideological situation in which they had written their works".

Intellectual life 
In May 1980, Nora founded at Gallimard the review  with philosopher Marcel Gauchet; this quickly became one of the major French intellectual reviews. In 1983 French historian Jacques Julliard judged Nora to be the natural heir to the role played by Raymond Aron. He also participated at the Saint-Simon Foundation, a think tank created in 1982 by François Furet – who had married Nora's sister, Jacqueline, – and Pierre Rosanvallon, until it was dissolved in 1999.

He opposed himself to the law of 23 February 2005 "supporting national recognition and national taxation in favour of French repatriations" and cosigned a petition in the daily  entitled . This law, at line 2 of article 4, was abrogated on 15 February 2006, establishing that research programmes must be accorded more importance in lieu of French overseas presence and that the programmes of study came to recognize the positive role.

Nora is equally well known for having directed , three volumes which gave as their point the work of enumerating the places and the objects in which are the incarnate national memory of the French.

Nora's book  ("The French of Algeria") (1961) has received scholarly criticism for its alleged bias against French Algerians ("Pieds-Noirs") – a prejudice held by many French intellectuals of the time. Nora posited that the French Algerians (or settlers) were different from the French of the Metropol. His opinions were developed from his two years as a high school teacher in Algiers. "The French of Algeria" is described as synthesizing "a self-righteous anti-pied noir discourse". "The French of Algiers" is often cited as a scholarly work, though some dissent. David Prochaska, American historian of French Algeria argues that it is in fact "not based on original research and is devoid of the usual scholarly apparatus".

Private life 
Nora is an Ashkenazi Jew. In 2001, on the occasion of his induction into the Académie française in the wake of the death of the novelist Michel Droit, he had his ceremonial sword inscribed with the Star of David to attest to his feeling that 'the Jewish contribution to the world belongs to things of the mind more than to weaponry. Because I shall consider myself Jewish as long as somewhere a Jew is threatened because of his identity.' He was married briefly to art historian and curator Françoise Cachin, and had a 40-year extra-conjugal relationship with Gabrielle van Zuylen, who died in 2010. Since 2012, he has lived with French journalist Anne Sinclair, ex-wife of journalist Ivan Levai and of former politician Dominique Strauss-Kahn. He has a son, now a biologist in San Francisco, by a third companion.

Bibliography 
 1961: , prefaced by Charles-André Julien (Julliard)
 1962:   issue 463
 1970–1979:  (Armand Colin)
 1973:  (Gallimard)
 1987:  (Gallimard)
 1984–1992:  (Gallimard), abridged translation, Realms of Memory, Columbia University Press, 1996–1998
 1999: Rethinking France: Les Lieux de mémoire, Volume 1: The State (University of Chicago Press)
 2006: Rethinking France: Les Lieux de mémoire, Volume 2: Space (University of Chicago Press)
 2009: Rethinking France: Les Lieux de mémoire, Volume 3: Legacies (University of Chicago Press)
 2010: Rethinking France: Les Lieux de mémoire, Volume 4: Histories and Memories (University of Chicago Press)

See also 
 Memory space (social science)

Notes

Citations

Sources

External links 
  L'Académie française
  Biographical note of the l'Académie française
  Catalogue of the Collection Archives of Gallimard Julliard (founded by Pierre Nora in 1964)

1931 births
20th-century French historians
20th-century French Jews
Commandeurs of the Ordre des Arts et des Lettres
French male non-fiction writers
Grand Officiers of the Légion d'honneur
Jewish historians
Living people
Lycée Carnot alumni
Lycée Louis-le-Grand alumni
Members of the Académie Française
Officers of the Ordre national du Mérite
Writers from Paris